William Gray (21 December 1814 – 6 February 1895) was an English Conservative Party politician who sat in the House of Commons from 1857 to 1874.

Gray was the second son of William Gray of Wheatfield, in the Haulgh, Bolton, and his wife Frances Rasbotham, daughter of Dorning Rasbotham of Birch House, near Bolton. He was educated privately and in 1835 was cornet in the Duke of Lancaster's Own Yeomanry Cavalry. He was captain in the 4th Royal Lancashire Militia, and Lieutenant-Colonel of the 27th Lancashire Rifle Volunteers.

He owned the Lever Bridge cotton mill in Darcy Lever which in 1891 had 21,000 spindles and 420 looms. From 1850 to 1852, Gray was Mayor of Bolton. He was a Deputy Lieutenant and J.P. for Lancashire.

At the 1857 general election Gray was elected as a Member of Parliament (MP) for Bolton. He held the seat until he was defeated at the 1874 general election. He was a liberal Conservative and was in favour of education based on religion.

Gray lived at Darcy Lever Hall, near Bolton, in Lancashire (now Greater Manchester) and Farley Hill Place in Berkshire. He was High Sheriff of Berkshire for 1882–83.

He died at the age of 80. Gray married Magdalene Robin, daughter of John Robin of West Kirby Cheshire, in 1861.

References

External links
 
 Bolton Council-The Mayors of Bolton

1814 births
1895 deaths
People from Bolton
Mayors of Bolton
Conservative Party (UK) MPs for English constituencies
People from Swallowfield
UK MPs 1857–1859
UK MPs 1859–1865
UK MPs 1865–1868
UK MPs 1868–1874
Duke of Lancaster's Own Yeomanry officers
High Sheriffs of Berkshire
Deputy Lieutenants of Lancashire